The 1966 UC Santa Barbara Gauchos football team represented University of California, Santa Barbara (UCSB) during the 1966 NCAA College Division football season.

UCSB competed as an Independent in 1966. The team was led by third-year head coach "Cactus Jack" Curtice, and played home games at the new Campus Stadium in Santa Barbara, California. They finished the season with a record of six wins and four losses (6–4). For the 1966 season they outscored their opponents 261–159.

Schedule

Notes

References

UC Santa Barbara
UC Santa Barbara Gauchos football seasons
UC Santa Barbara Gauchos football